ASHK Sadek (30 April 1934 – 9 September 2007) was a Bangladesh Awami League politician, who was a Jatiya Sangsad member representing the Jessore-6 constituency, and a former Education Minister of Bangladesh.

Early life
Sadek was born on 30 April 1934 in Barenga, Keshabpur, Jessore district. His father was the joint commissioner of the Government of Bengal. In 1951, he graduated from secondary school and in 1955 he completed his master's degree. Sadek joined the civil service of Pakistan in 1956.

Career
From 1959 to 1961, he served as the sub-divisional officer of Nilphamari and Narayanganj. He worked as the Comilla deputy commissioner from 1966 to 1967 and the secretary to the Governor of East Pakistan from 1969 to 1970. He was the secretary to Tajuddin Ahmad, the then Prime Minister of Bangladesh and later chief secretary to the President of Bangladesh. He was a secretary of a number of ministries and retired from government service in 1988. In 1996 he was elected to the national parliament from Jessore-6 and again in 2001. He was a Minister of Education in the cabinet of Sheikh Hasina.

Death and legacy
Sadek died on 9 September 2007. His wife, Ismat Ara Sadek, was a government minister.  ASHK Sadek auditorium in Keshabpur is named after him.

References

1934 births
2007 deaths
People from Jessore District
Awami League politicians
7th Jatiya Sangsad members
8th Jatiya Sangsad members
Education ministers of Bangladesh